Fawcett Books is an imprint of Ballantine Books (now a division of Random House Publishing Group). Fawcett Publications, founded in 1919, published primarily magazines and comics. In 1970 it acquired Popular Library and renamed it Fawcett Books. Fawcett Publications, along with Fawcett Books, was bought by CBS in 1977 and in 1982 Fawcett Books was acquired by Ballantine Books.

Coventry Romance was a historical romance series published by Fawcett Coventry from 1979 to 1982. Most of the stories were set in the Regency era, but also in the Georgian and Victorian eras. Coventry Romance By The Numbers was a numbered list of 206 titles. These books are generally considered to be "traditional" Regency novels.

Un-numbered titles include:
 Tarrington Chase - Sylvia Thorpe, March 1980
 Romantic Lady - Sylvia Thorpe, March 1980
 Star Sapphire - Rebecca Danton, March 1980
 Clarissa - Caroline Arnett, March 1980
 Jewelene - Claudette Williams, March 1980
 An Affair Of The Heart - Joan Smith, March 1980
 Lovers' Vows - Joan Smith, July 1982
 Rosalba - Sheila Bishop, July 1982
 The Reluctant Viscountess - Jasmine Cresswell, July 1982
 Love And Lady Lovelace - Marion Chesney, July 1982

References

Random House